The 2nd Fußball-Bundesliga (women) 2005–06 was the 2nd season of the 2. Fußball-Bundesliga (women), Germany's second football league. It began on 14 August 2005 and ended on 5 June 2006.

Group North

Final standings 

Pld = Matches played; W = Matches won; D = Matches drawn; L = Matches lost; GF = Goals for; GA = Goals against; GD = Goal difference; Pts = Points

Group South

Final standings 

* VfL Singelfingen was relegated to the 2. Bundesliga therefore Sindelfingen II was automatically relegated to the Regionalliga instead of Karlsruher SC.

Pld = Matches played; W = Matches won; D = Matches drawn; L = Matches lost; GF = Goals for; GA = Goals against; GD = Goal difference; Pts = Points

References 

2005-06
Ger
2
Women2